Antoine Lefort-Mousel (1879 – 1928) was a Luxembourgish politician and diplomat.  A member of Luxembourg's Chamber of Deputies for the Party of the Right, he served as the Director-General for Public Works from 24 February 1916 until 28 September 1918.  Later, he served as a diplomat, including as chargé d'affaires in Switzerland.

Footnotes

References
 

Ministers for Public Works of Luxembourg
Members of the Chamber of Deputies (Luxembourg)
Members of the Council of State of Luxembourg
Party of the Right (Luxembourg) politicians
Luxembourgian people of World War I
Luxembourgian diplomats
1879 births
1928 deaths